Malaia may refer to:

 Mălaia (river), in Vâlcea Romania
 Malaia, Vâlcea, Romania, a commune
 Malaia garnet, gemological varietal name of garnet

See also
 Malaya (disambiguation)
 Malia (disambiguation)